Barry Desmond Butlin (born 9 November 1949) is an English former footballer who played for Notts County, Luton Town and Nottingham Forest, Peterborough United and Sheffield United, among others, between the late 1960s and the early 1980s.

Playing career

Butlin started out with his local side, Derby County, in 1967. He remained with the club until 1972, spending two successful loan spells at Notts County; he then signed for Luton Town. 
After two years with Luton he signed for Nottingham Forest, then after three years and two spells out on loan he signed for Peterborough United. He spent two years with Peterborough before signing for Sheffield United. After two seasons with the Blades, he retired.

References

1949 births
Living people
English Football League players
English footballers
Derby County F.C. players
Notts County F.C. players
Luton Town F.C. players
Nottingham Forest F.C. players
Brighton & Hove Albion F.C. players
Reading F.C. players
Peterborough United F.C. players
Sheffield United F.C. players
People from South Derbyshire District
Footballers from Derbyshire
Association football forwards